Gregory, Gregg or Greg Thompson may refer to:

 Greg Thompson (1947–2019), Canadian politician and long-serving MP
 Gregg Thompson (born 1961), American professional soccer player
 Greg Thompson (American football) (born 1950), American college football coach
 Gregg Thompson (astronomer), Australian amateur astronomer
 Greg Thompson (bishop) (born 1956), Anglican bishop of Newcastle (Australia) and formerly the Northern Territory of Australia
 Greg Thompson (cricketer) (born 1987), Irish cricketer for Lancashire and Hampshire
 Gregory Thompson (South African cricketer) (born 1971), South African cricketer
 Gregory Thompson (writer), American television producer and writer
 Greg Thompson (music executive), American record executive
 Greg Thompson (Canadian football) (born 1940s), Canadian football player

See also 
 Greg Thomson (disambiguation)